The 2018–19 San Diego Toreros women's basketball team represents the University of San Diego in the 2018–19 college basketball season. The Toreros, as members of the West Coast Conference, were led by fourteenth year head coach Cindy Fisher. The Toreros play their home games at the Jenny Craig Pavilion on the university campus in San Diego, California. They finished the season 9–21, 2–16 in WCC play to finish in a tie for ninth place. They lost in the first round of the WCC women's tournament to Santa Clara.

Roster

Schedule

|-
!colspan=9 style=| Exhibition

|-
!colspan=9 style=| Non-conference regular season

|-
!colspan=9 style=| WCC regular season

|-
!colspan=9 style=| WCC Women's Tournament

Rankings
2018–19 NCAA Division I women's basketball rankings

See also
2018–19 San Diego Toreros men's basketball team

References

San Diego
San Diego Toreros women's basketball seasons
San Diego Toreros
San Diego Toreros